Ng Fung Ho v. White, 259 U.S. 276 (1922), is a United States Supreme Court decision holding that habeas corpus petitioners are entitled to a de novo judicial hearing to adjudicate claims that they are citizens of the United States.

See also
List of United States Supreme Court cases, volume 259

References

External links
 

1922 in United States case law
United States Supreme Court cases
United States Supreme Court cases of the Taft Court